Kevin Doyle (born 1983) is an Irish footballer

Kevin Doyle may also refer to:

Kevin Doyle (actor) (born 1961), English actor
Kevin Doyle (rugby league), Sydney Roosters player, 1953–54
Kevin Doyle, a fictional character in the 2008 romantic comedy film 27 Dresses